This is a list of Virtual Console games that are available on the Nintendo 3DS in North America.

Available titles 
The following is a list of the 191 games (203 including those available for Nintendo 3DS Ambassadors, and delisted titles like Tetris and Donkey Kong: Original Edition) available on the Virtual Console for the Nintendo 3DS in North America, sorted by system and in the order they were added in Nintendo eShop. To sort by other columns, click the corresponding icon in the header row.

Game Boy 
These titles were originally released for use on the Game Boy system, which was launched in 1989. The first three Nintendo 3DS Virtual Console titles were Game Boy games and debuted alongside the Nintendo 3DS eShop in June 2011.

There are 50 games available to purchase.

Game Boy Color 
These titles were originally released for use on the Game Boy Color system, which was launched in 1998.

There are 31 games available to purchase.

Game Gear 
These titles were originally released for use on the Game Gear system, which was launched in 1991.

There are 16 games available to purchase.

Nintendo Entertainment System 
These titles were originally released for use on the Nintendo Entertainment System, which was launched in 1985. The first 10 NES games were released on August 31, 2011 to Nintendo 3DS Ambassadors. These games were later released to the general public with additional features, such as the ability to save the game at any point; the Ambassador versions were patched to add the new features.

There are 64 games available to purchase. The Mysterious Murasame Castle and Summer Carnival '92: Recca made their first official appearances in North America when they were added to the 3DS Virtual Console. Donkey Kong: Original Edition also made its North American debut, but it was available only as a promotional bonus and was removed from availability after the promotion ended.

Super Nintendo Entertainment System 
These titles were originally released for use on the Super Nintendo Entertainment System, which was launched in 1991. These Virtual Console titles are exclusively available for New Nintendo 3DS platforms (New Nintendo 3DS, New Nintendo 3DS XL, and New Nintendo 2DS XL). Nintendo has claimed that the reason for this is due to technical issues regarding the CPU in older Nintendo 3DS models for rendering the emulation, but some fan-made emulators compatible with the old 3DS exist that will run SNES games at full speed.

There are 30 games available to purchase on the New Nintendo 3DS platforms (New Nintendo 3DS, New Nintendo 3DS XL and New Nintendo 2DS XL).

Delisted titles

Game Boy 

There was 1 title that used to be available to purchase, but has since been delisted from the service due to Nintendo's Tetris license expiring, as Ubisoft held the license at the time.

Promotion-exclusive titles

Nintendo Entertainment System 

There was 1 title that was exclusively available as a promotional bonus, which was removed from availability after the promotion ended on January 6, 2013.

Game Boy Advance 
These titles were originally released for use on the Game Boy Advance, which was launched in 2001. Like the initial NES Virtual Console games, these titles were released exclusively to Nintendo 3DS Ambassadors. Unlike the NES titles, these games have not been released to the general public. Additionally, since these titles run natively and are not emulated, they do not support typical emulation features, such as suspended play and restore points.

These are the 10 Game Boy Advance games that were available exclusively for Nintendo 3DS Ambassadors.

See also 
 List of Virtual Console games for Wii (North America)
 List of Virtual Console games for Wii U (North America)
 List of DSiWare games and applications
 List of DSiWare games (North America)
 3D Classics

References 

Video game lists by platform
Nintendo-related lists